Albert Kahn (3 March 1860 – 14 November 1940) was a French banker and philanthropist, known for initiating The Archives of the Planet, a vast photographical project. Spanning 22 years, it resulted in a collection of 72,000 colour photographs and 183,000 metres of film.

Biography

Early life 
He was born Abraham Kahn in Marmoutier, Bas-Rhin, France on 3 March 1860, the eldest of four children of Louis Kahn, a Jewish cattle dealer, and Babette Kahn (née Bloch), an uneducated homebound mother.

Kahn's mother died when he was ten years old, and, following the German annexation of Alsace-Lorraine in 1871, the Kahn family moved to Saint-Mihiel in north-eastern France in 1872 where he continued his studies at the Collège de Saverne from 1873 to 1876.

In 1879, Kahn became a bank clerk in Paris, but studied for a degree in the evenings. His tutor was Henri Bergson, who became his lifelong friend. He graduated in 1881 and continued to mix in intellectual circles, making friends with Auguste Rodin and Mathurin Méheut. In 1892 Kahn became a principal associate of the Goudchaux Bank, which was then regarded as one of the most important financial houses of Europe. He also promoted higher education through travelling scholarships.

Later life 
The economic crisis of the Great Depression ruined Kahn and put an end to his project. 
Kahn died at Boulogne-Billancourt, Hauts-de-Seine, France on 14 November 1940 during the Nazi occupation of France.

Gardens of the World 
The Gardens of the World was a garden Kahn created.
In 1893 he acquired a large property in Boulogne-Billancourt, where he established this unique garden containing a variety of garden styles including English, Japanese, a rose garden and a conifer wood. This became a meeting place for French and European intelligentsia until the 1930s when, due to the Crash of 1929, Kahn became bankrupt. At that time the garden was turned into a public park in which Kahn would still take walks.  The garden brings together distinct traditions (French, English and Japanese), as if to illustrate the utopia of a world reconciled, where different realities can coexist in perfect harmony.

Archives of the Planet 

The Archives of the Planet was a photographic endeavour to document buildings and cultures around the world.

Method 

In 1909, Kahn travelled with his chauffeur and photographer, Alfred Dutertre, to Japan on business and returned with many photographs of the journey. This prompted him to begin a project collecting a photographic record of the entire Earth. He appointed Jean Brunhes as the project director, and sent photographers to every continent to record images of the planet using the first practical medium for colour photography, Autochrome plates, and early cinematography. Between 1909 and 1931 they collected 72,000 colour photographs and 183,000 meters of film. These form a unique historical record of 50 countries, known as The Archives of the Planet.

Kahn's photographers began documenting France in 1914, just days before the outbreak of World War I, and by liaising with the military managed to record both the devastation of war and the struggle to continue everyday life and agricultural work.

Musée Albert-Kahn 

Since 1986, the photographs have been collected into a museum at 14 Rue du Port, Boulogne-Billancourt, Paris, at the site of his garden. It is now a French national museum and includes four hectares of gardens, as well as the museum which houses his historic photographs and films.

See also 
Autochrome Lumière 
Sergey Prokudin-Gorsky

References 
 
 
  Albert Kahn Biography Translate
  Albert Kahn gardens Official website Translate (also  Ministry of Culture summary, Translate)
  Albert Kahn museum, the new official website or old link
  Maghreb in colors Exhibition until March 2008, Official website, Translate
 Castro, Teresa, Les Archives de la Planète. A Cinematographic Atlas, in Jump Cut The story of Kahn's photographic atlas (accessed November 2007)

External links 

 Edwardians In Colour: The Wonderful World Of Albert Kahn – BBC TV programme April 2007
 

French bankers
French expatriates in Japan
French philanthropists
19th-century French Jews
Pioneers of photography
Alsatian Jews
People from Bas-Rhin
1860 births
1940 deaths